Franklin County State Airport  is a public airport located three miles (5 km) west of the central business district of Highgate, a town in Franklin County, Vermont, United States. It is owned by the State of Vermont.

Although most U.S. airports use the same three-letter location identifier for the FAA and IATA, Franklin County State Airport is assigned FSO by the FAA but has no designation from the IATA.

Facilities and aircraft 
For the 12-month period ending August 31, 2009, the airport had 10,200 aircraft operations, an average of 28 per day: 93% general aviation, 7% military and <1% air taxi. There are 86 aircraft based at this airport: 90% single engine, 3% multi-engine, 1% helicopters and 6% ultralights.

The airport was purchased by the State of Vermont and a new paved north-south runway was constructed in 1969.

For the last 25 years the airport has been known for the odd and unique aircraft based there.

Specializing in former Soviet Bloc aircraft, the FBO (Border Air Ltd.) has imported over 300 aircraft most notably the Yakovlev 52.

The airport is home to EAA Chapter 613 providing all aviation enthusiasts education and community.

A ramp extension is planned for FY2024 to connect to the ramp upgrade and expansion.

A runway extension and upgrade is planned for FY2023.

Notable events 
The Grateful Dead gave two performances at the airport: on July 13, 1994, and on June 15, 1995.

References

External links 
Franklin County State Airport at Vermont Airport Directory

Airports in Vermont
Transportation buildings and structures in Franklin County, Vermont
Buildings and structures in Highgate, Vermont